Thorsby is a town in Chilton County, Alabama, United States. As of the 2010 census, the population of the town was 1,980. The town mayor is Robert Hight.

Geography
Thorsby is located north of the center of Chilton County at 32°55'1.171" North, 86°42'57.442" West (32.916992, -86.715956).

Demographics

2020 census

As of the 2020 United States census, there were 2,064 people, 706 households, and 486 families residing in the town.

2010 census
As of the census of 2010, there were 1,980 people, 733 households, and 573 families residing in the town. There were 817 housing units at an average density of 158.9/sq mi (61.4/km2). The racial makeup of the town was 89.7% White, 5.7% Black or African American, 0.1% Native American, 0.6% Asian, 0.1% Pacific Islander, 3.3% from other races, and 0.6% from two or more races. 5.7% of the population were Hispanic or Latino of any race.

There were 733 households, out of which 34.0% had children under the age of 18 living with them, 62.1% were married couples living together, 11.2% had a female householder with no husband present, and 21.8% were non-families. 19.2% of all households were made up of individuals, and 8.4% had someone living alone who was 65 years of age or older. The average household size was 2.70 and the average family size was 3.06.

In the town, the population was spread out, with 25.8% under the age of 18, 8.8% from 18 to 24, 27.7% from 25 to 44, 25.8% from 45 to 64, and 11.9% who were 65 years of age or older. The median age was 37 years. For every 100 females, there were 96.2 males. For every 100 females age 18 and over, there were 98.7 males.

The median income for a household in the town was $45,179, and the median income for a family was $52,813. Males had a median income of $43,235 versus $37,772 for females. The per capita income for the town was $21,269. 11.9% of the population and 9.5% of families were below the poverty line. Out of the total population, 19.6% of those under the age of 18 and 7.6% of those 65 and older were living below the poverty line.

Climate
The spring and summer are moderately rainy, with frequent strong to severe thunderstorms. The fall and winter months are cold and cloudy. The town is almost always under cloud cover from November to March. In late winter, normally from January through February, Thorsby normally acquires small amounts of snow accumulation.

The spring and fall months are pleasant but variable as cold fronts frequently bring strong to severe thunderstorms and occasional tornadoes to the region. The fall season features more rainfall and fewer storms, as well as lower humidity than the spring, but it is also a secondary severe weather season. Thorsby is located on the heart of a tornado alley known as the Dixie Alley due to the frequency of tornadoes in Central Alabama. In late summer and fall months, Thorsby experiences occasional tropical storms and hurricanes due to its proximity to the Central Gulf Coast.

History

Thorsby is a small Central Alabama town located in Chilton County. Thorsby was first settled in 1815 and incorporated in 1901 by Scandinavian immigrants who had originally settled in the midwestern United States, but who were seeking a milder climate and fertile soil for growing food. One of those earliest settlers was Theodore T. Thorson, for whom the town was eventually named (the suffix "by" meaning "settlement" in Scandinavian languages). The town grew quickly, with two hotels, a sawmill and lumber company, and two wineries being built within the first couple of years. The town of Thorsby was declared a promised land for northerners looking to relocate to a warmer climate, suitable for farming and better health. The fertile soil of the South produced grapes in large numbers, along with other fruits such as strawberries, and the peaches for which Chilton County is famous. The founders formed the Concordia Land and Improvement Association and began advertising in New England newspapers about the "utopia" they had discovered in the Southeastern United States. Many traveled by railroad to purchase a tract of land and start a better life. Thorsby became affectionately known as the little "Swede town" by locals.

Each autumn, the town of Thorsby celebrates its heritage with the Annual Swedish Festival that includes an arts and crafts fair, a pageant, music, car and motorcycle shows and food native to the American South. The town maintains a museum in the old Norwegian Lutheran Church, now called "Helen Jenkins Chapel". A Scandinavian Cemetery is available for visits any time. The town operates its own police and fire departments, as well as departments of building inspection, law, parks and recreation, and the Thorsby Water Works. The Chilton County School System operates the K-12 Thorsby School in the town.

Thorsby High School

Thorsby High School is a 3-A, K-12 educational institution. It has been a public school since 1957. The school originated as Thorsby Institute shortly after the town was founded in the early 1900s. Thorsby Institute was founded as a private school and was turned over to the Chilton County Board of Education to become a part of the public school system. Thorsby Institute provided a quality education for many years to local and out-of-state students.

There is an old school house in central Thorsby, which was in use until the mid-1970s.

Based on its state test results, Thorsby High School has received a Great Schools Rating of 3 out of 10. 834 students attended Thorsby High School in the 2006–2007 school year. During the 2006–07 school year there were 51 teachers on staff, giving Thorsby High School a student-teacher ratio of 16.5. There were 54 kindergartners, 66 first graders, 61 second graders, 59 third graders, 65 fourth graders, 69 fifth graders, 74 sixth graders, 74 seventh graders, 69 eighth graders, 70 freshmen, 53 sophomores, 63 juniors, and 57 seniors during that year. Currently, there are 388 (45%) of students enrolled that are eligible for discounted/free lunch. The school mascot is the Thorsby Rebel, and the colors are maroon and white. The high school's principal is Corey Clements, and the vice principal is Tim Fortner.

Notable person
 Jackie Burkett, former NFL center
 William Sprague (1830–1915); U.S. Senator and the 27th governor of Rhode Island; born in Cranston, RI (spent ages 4–7 residing in Thorsby)

References

External links
Town of Thorsby Alabama website
Thorsby Swedish Fest

Towns in Alabama
Towns in Chilton County, Alabama
Birmingham metropolitan area, Alabama
Populated places established in 1815
Swedish migration to North America
Swedish-American culture in Alabama